John Philip Algernon Gould,  (20 December 1927 – 19 October 2001) was a British classical scholar. He specialised in Greek tragedy, but also had wider interests in ancient Greek literature, ancient Greek religion and anthropology. He began his academic career as a research fellow at Jesus College, Cambridge (1949–1953), and then a tutor and student (i.e. fellow) at Christ Church, Oxford (1954–1968). He was Chair of Classics at the University College of Swansea from 1968 to 1974, and the H O Wills Professor of Greek at the University of Bristol from 1974 to 1991.

Early life and education
Gould was born on 20 December 1927. His father was Harold Gould, a school teacher of Latin, and his mother was Marjorie Gould, a lecturer in French at Birkbeck College, London. He was educated at Wellingborough School, a private school in Wellingborough, Northamptonshire, and University College School, an independent school in Hampstead, London. Having been awarded a scholarship, he studied the Classical Tripos at Jesus College, Cambridge, graduating with a double first Bachelor of Arts (BA) degree in 1948: he was awarded a "special merit" in ancient philosophy.

Having completed his undergraduate degree, Gould was required to undertake eighteen months of National Service. Following officer training, he was commissioned in the Royal Army Educational Corps as a second lieutenant on 4 February 1949. In one obituary, it was stated that "he did not greatly enjoy army life".

Personal life
While at University College School, Gould met and began a relationship with Pauline Bending. The couple were married by the time Gould moved to the University of Oxford in 1954. Pauline worked as a nurse, then as a teacher, and finally as a social worker. Together they had four children.

In 1974, Gould began an affair with Gillian Tuckett, a school teacher who had attended his Ancient Greek summer school. They separated from their respective spouses and married each other. Gould became step-father to Gillian's three children, and would have "almost no contact" with the children from his first marriage for the rest of his life.

Gould was ill in later life, having developed Sjögren's syndrome and suffering detached retinas in both eyes (only one eye could be saved). He was diagnosed with lymphatic cancer and died on 19 October 2001, aged 73.

Honours
In 1990, Gould was awarded the Runciman Award by the Anglo-Hellenic League for his book Herodotus (1989).

In 1991, Gould was elected a Fellow of the British Academy (FBA), the United Kingdom's national academy for the humanities and social sciences.

Selected works

References

1927 births
2001 deaths
British classical scholars
Fellows of Jesus College, Cambridge
Fellows of Christ Church, Oxford
Academics of Swansea University
Classical scholars of the University of Bristol
Classical scholars of the University of Cambridge
Classical scholars of the University of Oxford
Scholars of ancient Greek literature
Scholars of Greek mythology and religion
Fellows of the British Academy
People educated at Wellingborough School
People educated at University College School
Royal Army Educational Corps officers